The 2020–21 SFA South Region Challenge Cup (known as The SoccerShop Challenge Cup for sponsorship reasons) was the 14th edition of the annual knockout cup competition for senior non-league clubs in the central and southern regions of Scotland. This season sees the tournament increase from 70 to 121 teams thanks to additional clubs joining the East of Scotland Football League and the inclusion of 67 clubs from the inaugural West of Scotland Football League.

Arniston Rangers and Cumbernauld Colts are not competing due to a breach of rules in the previous season's competition. A number of clubs withdrew before the start of the tournament, including those who declined to take part in the WoSFL.

Due to Scottish Government restrictions, games were played behind closed doors because of the COVID-19 pandemic. 

On 11 January 2021 the competition was suspended by the Scottish Football Association due to the escalating pandemic situation. With the season already complete for each of the four leagues competing in the tournament, the competition was declared null and void on 26 April 2021.

Format
The South Challenge Cup initially featured 142 senior non-league clubs from the Lowland Football League (16), East of Scotland Football League (47), South of Scotland Football League (12), and West of Scotland Football League (67). The reserve teams of Stirling University, Caledonian Braves, and Stranraer do not take part.

The draw is unseeded, with matches proceeding to extra time and penalties if they are tied after 90 minutes.

Calendar

First round
The draw for the first and second rounds took place on Saturday 5 September 2020 and was broadcast live on the Official Catchup YouTube channel. The majority of the first round fixtures took place on the weekend of Saturday 24 October 2020.

Second round
The majority of the second round fixtures took place on the weekend of 21 November 2020. A number of teams received a bye to the third round after 18 teams from the West of Scotland League withdrew from the competition.

Replay

Third round
The third round was due to take place on the weekend of Saturday 6 February 2021. The draw for the third round took place on Friday 12 December 2020 and was broadcast live on the Official Catchup YouTube channel.

Due to teams withdrawing in the previous rounds, Gartcairn and Port Glasgow received a bye to the fourth round.

References

2020–21 in Scottish football cups
South Challenge Cup seasons